Katrina Alison Armstrong is an American internist. She is the chief executive officer of the Columbia University Irving Medical Center and Dean of the Faculties of Health Sciences and the Columbia University Vagelos College of Physicians and Surgeons. Armstrong is the first woman to lead Columbia's medical school and medical center. Previously, she was the first woman to hold the position of Physician-in-Chief at Massachusetts General Hospital and was elected to the National Academy of Medicine in 2013 and the American Academy of Arts and Sciences in 2020.

Early life and education
Armstrong grew up in Alabama and attended Indian Springs School. Upon graduating, she attended Yale University for her Bachelor of Architecture degree, Johns Hopkins University for her medical degree, and the University of Pennsylvania for her Master of Science in Clinical Epidemiology degree. She completed her residency training in internal medicine at Johns Hopkins.

Career

University of Pennsylvania
Armstrong joined the Division of General Internal Medicine at the Perelman School of Medicine at the University of Pennsylvania (UPenn) in 1996 as a Physician-Scientist Fellow before accepting a professorship position in 1998 following her master's degree. At the turn of the century, she received a UPenn University Research Foundation Award to fund her projects  Identifying and Reaching Populations at Risk: The Paradox of Cancer Control and Housestaff Depression and Career Choices. As an assistant professor of medicine and epidemiology in the Division of General Internal Medicine at UPenn, Armstrong co-developed and directed the first and second-year medical course "Clinical Decision Making." In recognition of her teaching, she received the 2003 Leonard Berwick Award, awarded to "a member of the medical faculty who in his or her teaching most effectively fuses basic science and clinical medicine."

On September 7, 2004, Armstrong was appointed the Director of Research at the Leonard Davis Institute of Health Economics. In this role, she also served as director of UPenn's FOCUS on Health & Leadership Program Research Programs, which received the 2004 Association of American Medical Colleges Women in Medicine Leadership Development Award. While continuing her research into cancer control, genetic testing for cancer susceptibility, and racial disparities in cancer outcomes, she earned the Samuel Martin Health Evaluation Sciences Research Award for "her research program that seeks to elucidate the complex relationships among the social environment, health care use, and health outcomes." In 2006, Armstrong was elected to the American Society of Clinical Investigation for her records of scholarly achievement in biomedical research.

As an associate professor of Medicine, Obstetrics and Gynecology, and Biostatistics and Epidemiology, Armstrong was appointed Chief of the Division of General Internal Medicine at the Penn School of Medicine in 2008. In this role, she co-led a longitudinal observational study with Robert Hornik to explore whether patient-clinician information exchange is associated with differences in cancer patient health behaviors, health care utilization and health outcomes. By 2011, Armstrong and Mitchell Schnall received a five-year, $7.5 million grant from the National Cancer Institute to create the Penn Center for Innovation in Personalized Breast Cancer Screening.

Harvard and MGH
In 2013, Armstrong was appointed chair of medicine and physician-in-chief at Massachusetts General Hospital (MGH), becoming the first woman to hold the position. The day she began her tenure at MGH, the Boston Marathon bombing occurred and she said it enabled her to "see MGH come together in an extraordinary way to respond to the need of the community." In the same year, she was also elected to the National Academy of Medicine. Although she had left UPenn, Armstrong received their Pioneer Award for her "achievements and rise to some of the highest health care posts in government and academic medicine."

In April 2020, Armstrong was elected to the American Academy of Arts and Sciences.

Columbia University Irving Medical Center (CUIMC)
On March 1, 2022, Armstrong became the chief executive officer of Columbia University Irving Medical Center and Dean of the Faculties of Health Sciences and the Vagelos College of Physicians and Surgeons. She also is Executive Vice President for Health and Biomedical Sciences for Columbia University and the Harold and Margaret Hatch Professor in the Faculty of Medicine. Armstrong is the 25th dean of VP&S, founded in 1767 as the nation's second medical school but the first in the nation to award an MD degree. Armstrong is the first woman to lead Columbia's medical school and medical center.

Research
Armstrong's research focuses on medical decision making, quality of care, and cancer prevention and outcomes. Armstrong has helped transform understanding of cancer, genomics, and health care disparities. She has identified ways to improve cancer care using observational data, modeling, and personalized medicine. Her work has focused on cancer risk and prevention in Black and Latinx patients, examined racial inequities in genetic testing and neonatal care, and analyzed the roles that segregation, discrimination, and distrust play in the health of marginalized populations. Her most recent research studied disparities in rural areas and include partnerships with Lakota tribal communities and organizations in western South Dakota.

Awards and honors
 Member of the National Academy of Medicine (2013) 
 Member of the American Academy of Arts and Sciences (2020) 
 Member of the Association of American Physicians
 Member of the American Society for Clinical Investigation (2006) 
 Outstanding Junior Investigator of the Year Award from the Society of General Internal Medicine (2003) 
 Outstanding Investigator Award from the American Federation of Medical Research (2009) 
 Alice Hersh Award from AcademyHealth (2005)

Personal life
While attending Johns Hopkins University in the Osler residency program, she met her future husband Tom Randall, a gynecologic oncologist, and married him upon graduation. Armstrong and her husband Tom Randall have three children together.

References

Living people
Academics from Alabama
Yale College alumni
Johns Hopkins School of Medicine alumni
Perelman School of Medicine at the University of Pennsylvania alumni
University of Pennsylvania faculty
Harvard Medical School faculty
Columbia University faculty
Columbia Medical School faculty
Members of the National Academy of Medicine
Fellows of the American Academy of Arts and Sciences
Year of birth missing (living people)